Michalis "Iron Mike" Zambidis (Greek: Μιχάλης Ζαμπίδης; born 15 July 1980) is a professional Greek kickboxer and martial artist. He is an 18-time World Champion, including former World version W5, SUPERKOMBAT and in a series of K-1 Tournaments and Grand Prix Grand Prix Champion. He mostly competed in the K-1 MAX.

Biography and career
Mike Zambidis started training in martial arts before he was nine years old with his brother Spiros Zambidis and his best friend Lazaros Filipas. He has trained in Shotokan, Boxing, Kickboxing, Muay Thai, Wrestling, sanshou and   Pankration. He started competing professionally in 2000, scoring a string of victories over notable opponents. He was given the nickname Turkofagos (Turkeater) after his 11th win over Turkish fighters due to the fact that he never lost to a Turk. He has been technically knocked out twice himself early in his career due to cuts, but after 2002, his next technical knock-out defeat came in 2008 against Andy Souwer in an extra round.

From 2000 till 2002, Zambidis defeated notable kickboxer Jenk Behic twice, Gürkan Özkan twice who outweighed Mike by over 50 lbs in two rare open-weight fights, Kara Murat twice, Baris Nezif, Wanlop Sosathopan, Bakari Tounkara, Matteo Sciacca and Petr Polak. In 2002, he knocked out the strong and experienced Dutch-Moroccan Hassan Kassrioui. On November 26, 2002 he won the K-1 Oceania MAX 2002 title after defeating John Wayne Parr in the final.

In 2003, promoter Tarik Solak arranged Zambidis' debut fight in Japan against 2002 World K-1 Max Champion Albert Kraus, whom he knocked out in the 2nd round. In April 2005, Zambidis knocked out with a right hook the popular Norifumi "Kid" Yamamoto, in front of thousands of the Japanese kickboxer's fans. Zambidis' weakness seems to be receiving low kicks, as was seen in his 2006 defeat by Japanese Yoshihiro Sato, who, despite getting hurt by Zambidis' punches, managed to land many kicks and knees which racked up enough points to "secure a unanimous decision." Zambidis is a 4 time national champion in kickboxing as well as holding a large number of international titles.

In addition to his many outstanding fights, the K-1 World MAX 2010 Final 16 match on October the 3rd, 2010 against Chahid Oulad El Hadj was notable as being one of the most exciting of his career. In addition, as stated by ring side commentators "Sugar" Ray Sefo and Michael "The Voice" Schiavello, this contest was one by which a standard was set for other K-1 fights. However, Zambidis did not make it to the final as he lost to Giorgio Petrosyan by unanimous decision. Zambidis knocked down Petrosyan in the fight, but it was controversially ruled a slip by the referee.

Zambidis fought a rubber match (both having won 1 match apiece) with Australian Muay Thai champion John Wayne Parr in May 2011. He lost by TKO (three knockdowns) in round 1.

He defeated Reece McAllister by unanimous decision in the quarter-finals of the K-1 World MAX 2012 World Championship Tournament Final in Athens, Greece on December 15, 2012. He then lost by the eventual champion Murthel Groenhart in the semis. The much larger Groenhart won the fight with knees and punches, forcing his corner to stop the fight at the end of round two.

He was expected to compete in a four-man tournament in Russia on May 25, 2013, facing Dzhabar Askerov in the semi-finals. However, he was replaced by Enriko Gogokhia.

Zambidis beat Harun Kina by unanimous decision for the vacant SUPERKOMBAT Middleweight Championship at SUPERKOMBAT VIP Edition in Bucharest, Romania on August 31, 2013.

He was scheduled to fight Elam Ngor at the K-1 World MAX 2013 World Championship Tournament Final 16 in Majorca, Spain on September 14, 2013. However, he withdrew from the tournament and was replaced by Ismat Aghazade.

He lost to Xu Yan by unanimous decision, suffering controversial knockdowns in rounds one and two as he received below blows in both occasions, at Hero Legends in Jinan, China on January 3, 2014.

Zambidis and Batu Khasikov had a rematch fight and challenge the WKN Heavyweight Kickboxing World Championship at Fight Night: Battle of Moscow XV event in Moscow, Russia on March 28, 2014. The Russian Batu Khasikov won the battle again for the second time.

He won his first defence of his SUPERKOMBAT middleweight title against Harun Kina on January 17 at Iron Challenge 2015 from Athens, Greece.

In May 2015 he announced he would retire after his final fight in June against Steve Moxon, in his home country of Greece. This happened on 5 June 2015.

In October 2017, he participated in the reality game Nomads.

In March 2019,  returned to active action after 3.5 years off abstention for a professional boxing match vs Venezuelan Antonio Gomez. Although Zambidis sustained an injury during the 1st round that forced him to fight with only one hand, he was victorious after a gruelling fight.

Titles
 2019 BREAKOUT. Champion
 2015 World W.K.U. Champion
 2015 W.I.P.U. “King of the Ring” Oriental Rules Super Welterweight World Champion −71 kg (6th title defence)
 2015 SUPERKOMBAT Middleweight Championship -71 kg/156.5lb (2nd title defence)
 2013 SUPERKOMBAT Middleweight Championship -71 kg/156.5lb (One time)
 2012  K-1 World MAX 3rd Place
 2012  W.I.P.U. "King of the Ring" Oriental Rules Super Welterweight World Champion -71 kg (5th title defence)
 2011  W5 World Grand Prix KO World Champion -71 kg
 2011  W.I.P.U. "King of the Ring" Oriental Rules Super Welterweight World Champion -70 kg (4th title defence)
 2010  K-1 World MAX 3rd Place
 2009  World PROFI World Champion (1st title defence)
 2008  W.I.P.U. "King of the Ring" Oriental Rules Super Welterweight World Champion -70 kg (3rd title defence)
 2008  A-1 Combat Cup Super Welterweight World Champion
 2006  W.I.P.U. "King of the Ring" Oriental Rules Super Welterweight World Champion -70 kg (2nd title defence)
 2005  World PROFI World Champion
 2005	W.K.B.F. Super Welterweight World Champion
 2005  W.I.P.U. "King of the Ring" Oriental Rules Super Welterweight World Champion -70 kg (1st title defence)
 2004  A-1 World Combat Cup Champion -76 kg
 2003  W.I.P.U. "King of the Ring" Oriental Rules Super Welterweight World Champion -70 kg
 2002  W.O.K.A Super Welterweight World Champion (4th title defence)
 2002  K-1 World Max Oceania Champion
 2002  W.I.P.U. "King of the Ring" Thai Boxing Tournament Champion
 2001  W.O.K.A Super Welterweight World Champion (3 title defences that year)
 2000  W.O.K.A Super Welterweight World Champion
 1998	World PROFI Europe Champion
 1997	I.S.K.A. Balkan Champion
 1996/1998/1999/2000 Greek Boxing Champion

Kickboxing record

|-
|-  bgcolor="#CCFFCC"
| 2015-06-27 || Win ||align=left| Steve Moxon || Iron Challenge || Athens, Greece, || Decision || 5 || 3:00
|-
|-  bgcolor="#CCFFCC"
| 2015-05-09 || Win ||align=left| Erkan Varol || Iron Challenge 2015 || Limassol, Cyprus || Decision || 5 || 3:00
|-
|-  bgcolor="#CCFFCC"
| 2015-01-17 || Win ||align=left| Harun Kina || Iron Challenge 2015 || Athens, Greece  || KO (Right Kick/Left Hook) || 5 || 
|-
! style=background:white colspan=9 |
|-
|-  bgcolor="#FFBBBB"
| 2014-03-28 || Loss  ||align=left| Batu Khasikov || Fight Nights: Battle of Moscow 15 || Moscow, Russia  || Decision (Split) || 5 || 3:00
|-
! style=background:white colspan=9 |
|-
|-  bgcolor="#FFBBBB"
| 2014-01-03 || Loss ||align=left| Xu Yan || Hero Legends || Jinan, China || Decision (Unanimous) || 3 || 3:00
|-
! style=background:white colspan=9 |
|-
|-  bgcolor="#CCFFCC"
| 2013-08-31 || Win ||align=left| Harun Kina || SUPERKOMBAT VIP Edition || Bucharest, Romania || Decision (Unanimous) || 3 || 3:00
|-
! style=background:white colspan=9 |
|-
|-  bgcolor="#FFBBBB"
| 2012-12-15 || Loss ||align=left| Murthel Groenhart || K-1 World MAX 2012 World Championship Tournament Final, Semi Finals || Athens, Greece || TKO (Doctor Stoppage, Cut) || 2 || 3:00
|-
|-  bgcolor="#CCFFCC"
| 2012-12-15 || Win ||align=left| Reece McAllister || K-1 World MAX 2012 World Championship Tournament Final, Quarter Finals || Athens, Greece || Decision (Unanimous) || 3 || 3:00
|-
|-  bgcolor="#CCFFCC"
| 2012-05-27 || Win ||align=left| Chahid Oulad El Hadj || K-1 World MAX 2012 World Championship Tournament Final 16, First Round || Madrid, Spain || KO (Left Hook) || 3 || 1:34
|-
! style=background:white colspan=9 |
|-
|-  bgcolor="#CCFFCC"
| 2012-04-29 || Win ||align=left| Fadi Merza ||Iron Challenge || Athens, Greece || Decision (Unanimous) || 3 || 3:00
|-  bgcolor="#FFBBBB"
| 2011-11-05|| Loss ||align=left| Batu Khasikov || W5 || Moscow, Russia || TKO (Doctor Stoppage) || 1 || 1:51
|-
! style=background:white colspan=9 |
|-
|-  bgcolor="#CCFFCC"
| 2011-10-01|| Win ||align=left| Danila Utenkov || Kings of the Ring || Cyprus || Decision (Unanimous) || 3 ||3:00|-
|-  bgcolor="#FFBBBB"
| 2011-05-27|| Loss ||align=left| John Wayne Parr || Payback Time: "The Decider" || Melbourne, Australia || TKO (Referee Stoppage) || 1 ||
|-
|-  bgcolor="#CCFFCC"
| 2011-04-09|| Win ||align=left| Dzhabar Askerov || W5 Grand Prix K.O, Final || Moscow, Russia || Decision (Unanimous)|| 3 ||3:00 	
|-
! style=background:white colspan=9 |
|-
|-  bgcolor="#CCFFCC"
| 2011-04-09|| Win ||align=left| Enriko Gogokhia || W5 Grand Prix K.O, Semi Final || Moscow, Russia || Ext R. Decision (Unanimous) || 4 || 3:00 	
|-
|-  bgcolor="#CCFFCC"
| 2011-03-12|| Win ||align=left| Ali Gunyar || Iron Challenge || Athens, Greece ||  Decision (Unanimous) || 5 || 3:00
|-
! style=background:white colspan=9 |
|-
|-  bgcolor="#FFBBBB"
| 2010-11-08 || Loss ||align=left| Giorgio Petrosyan || K-1 World MAX 2010 Final Semi-final || Tokyo, Japan || Decision (Unanimous)  || 3 || 3:00
|-
|-  bgcolor="#CCFFCC"
| 2010-11-08 || Win ||align=left| Yuichiro Nagashima || K-1 World MAX 2010 Final Quarter-final || Tokyo, Japan || TKO (Referee Stoppage)  || 3 || 0:53
|-
|-  bgcolor="#CCFFCC"
| 2010-10-03 || Win ||align=left| Chahid Oulad El Hadj || K-1 World MAX 2010 Final 16 - Part 2 || Seoul, South Korea || Ext.R Decision (Unanimous) || 4 || 3:00
|-
! style=background:white colspan=9 |
|-
|-  bgcolor="#CCFFCC"
| 2010-03-20 || Win ||align=left| Warren Stevelmans || Kickboxing Superstar XIX || Milan, Italy || Decision (Unanimous) || 3 || 3:00
|-
|-  bgcolor="#CCFFCC"
| 2009-11-20 || Win ||align=left| Dzhabar Askerov || War of the Worlds || Brunswick, Australia || Decision (Majority) || 5 || 3:00
|-
|-  bgcolor="#FFBBBB"
| 2009-10-26 || Loss ||align=left| Hinata Watanabe || K-1 World MAX 2009 World Championship Super Fight || Yokohama, Japan || Decision (Unanimous) || 3 || 3:00
|-
|-  bgcolor="#FFBBBB"
| 2009-05-07 || Loss ||align=left| John Wayne Parr || Payback Time || Melbourne, Australia || Decision (Unanimous) || 5 || 3:00
|-
|-  bgcolor="#CCFFCC"
| 2009-01-31 || Win ||align=left| Rhassan Muhareb || Athletic Club "Minoas" || Heraklion, Crete, Greece || Decision (Unanimous) || 3 || 3:00
|-
! style=background:white colspan=9 |
|-
|-  bgcolor="#FFBBBB"
| 2008-07-07 || Loss ||align=left| Albert Kraus || K-1 World MAX 2008 World Championship Final 8 Super Fight || Tokyo, Japan || TKO (Doctor Stoppage) || 3 || 3:00
|-
|-  bgcolor="#CCFFCC"
| 2008-06-23 || Win ||align=left| Sanel Muslic || Iron Challenge || Athens, Greece || TKO (Referee Stoppage) || 3 || 2:00
|-
! style=background:white colspan=9 |
|-
|-  bgcolor="#FFBBBB"
| 2008-04-09 || Loss ||align=left| Andy Souwer || K-1 World MAX 2008 World Championship Final 16 || Hiroshima, Japan || Ext.R KO (Left High Kick) || 4 || 2:05
|-
! style=background:white colspan=9 |
|-
|-  bgcolor="#CCFFCC"
| 2008-03-03 || Win ||align=left| Daniel Dawson || No Respect 4 || Melbourne, Australia || Decision (Split) || 5 || 3:00
|-
! style=background:white colspan=9 |
|-
|-  bgcolor="#CCFFCC"
| 2007-12-09 || Win ||align=left| Bernardo Marban De La Horra || Urban Fighters || Athens, Greece || KO (Right Hooks) || 3 || 1:05
|-
|-  bgcolor="#FFBBBB"
| 2007-10-03 || Loss ||align=left| Artur Kyshenko || K-1 World MAX 2007 World Championship Quarter Finals || Tokyo, Japan || Ext.R Decision (Unanimous) || 4 || 3:00
|-
|-  bgcolor="#CCFFCC"
| 2007-06-28 || Win ||align=left| Gago Drago || K-1 World MAX 2007 World Tournament Final Elimination || Tokyo, Japan || Ext.R Decision (Unanimous) || 4 || 3:00
|-
! style=background:white colspan=9 |
|-
|-  bgcolor="#CCFFCC"
| 2007-04-04 || Win ||align=left| Kozo Takeda || K-1 World MAX 2007 World Elite Showcase || Yokohama, Japan || Decision (Unanimous) || 3 || 3:00
|-
|-  bgcolor="#CCFFCC"
| 2006-09-04 || Win ||align=left| Tatsuji || K-1 World MAX 2006 Champions Challenge || Tokyo, Japan || Decision (Unanimous) || 3 || 3:00
|-
|-  bgcolor="#FFBBBB"
| 2006-04-05 || Loss ||align=left| Yoshihiro Sato || K-1 World MAX 2006 World Tournament Open || Tokyo, Japan || Decision (Split) || 3 || 3:00
|-
! style=background:white colspan=9 |
|-
|-  bgcolor="#CCFFCC"
| 2006-03-12 || Win ||align=left| Michal Hansgut || Great Kickboxing Spectacle in Greece || Thessaloniki, Greece || Decision (Unanimous) || 3 || 3:00
|-
! style=background:white colspan=9 |
|-
|-  bgcolor="#FFBBBB"
| 2006-02-04 || Loss ||align=left| Buakaw Por. Pramuk || K-1 World MAX 2006 Japan Tournament || Saitama, Japan || Decision (Unanimous) || 3 || 3:00
|-
|-  bgcolor="#CCFFCC"
| 2005-11-07 || Win ||align=left| Kara Murat || No Respect 3 || Melbourne, Australia || Decision (Unanimous) || 5 || 3:00
|-
|-  bgcolor="#CCFFCC"
| 2005-10-12 || Win ||align=left| Satoru Suzuki || K-1 World MAX 2005 Champions' Challenge || Tokyo, Japan || KO || 2 || 1:17
|-
|-  bgcolor="#FFBBBB"
| 2005-07-20 || Loss ||align=left| Masato || K-1 World MAX 2005 Championship Quarter Finals || Yokohama, Japan || Decision (Unanimous) || 3 || 3:00
|-
|-  bgcolor="#CCFFCC"
| 2005-06-05 || Win ||align=left| Kara Murat || Professional Title Gala || Athens, Greece || Decision (Unanimous) || 5 || 3:00
|-
|-  bgcolor="#CCFFCC"
| 2005-05-04 || Win ||align=left| Norifumi Yamamoto || K-1 World MAX 2005 World Tournament Open || Tokyo, Japan || KO (Right Hook) || 3 || 0:39
|-
! style=background:white colspan=9 |
|-
|-  bgcolor="#CCFFCC"
| 2005-03-12 || Win ||align=left| Goran Borović || Greece and Serbia Fight the World || Sydney, Australia || KO (Overhand Right) || 5 ||
|-
! style=background:white colspan=9 |
|-
|-  bgcolor="#CCFFCC"
| 2005-02-20 || Win ||align=left| Stanley Nandex || Kicker vs Boxer || Melbourne, Australia || KO || 1 || 
|-
|-  bgcolor="#CCFFCC"
| 2004-10-13 || Win ||align=left| Kojiro || K-1 World MAX 2004 Champions' Challenge || Tokyo, Japan || KO (3 Knockdowns, Punches) || 1 || 2:21
|-
|-  bgcolor="#CCFFCC"
| 2004-11-28 || Win ||align=left| Gurkan Ozkan || A-1 World Combat Cup 2004, Final || Melbourne, Australia || Decision (Unanimous) || 3 || 3:00
|-
! style=background:white colspan=9 |
|-
|-  bgcolor="#CCFFCC"
| 2004-11-28 || Win ||align=left| Hamid Boujaoub || A-1 World Combat Cup 2004, Semi Finals || Melbourne, Australia || Decision (Unanimous) || 3 || 3:00
|-
|-  bgcolor="#CCFFCC"
| 2004-11-28 || Win ||align=left| Pete Spratt || A-1 World Combat Cup 2004, Quarter Finals || Melbourne, Australia || TKO (Ref Stop/3 Knockdowns)  || 2 ||
|-
|-  bgcolor="#FFBBBB"
| 2004-04-07 || Loss ||align=left| Takayuki Kohiruimaki || K-1 World MAX 2004 World Tournament Quarter Finals || Tokyo, Japan || Decision (Unanimous) || 3 || 3:00
|-
|-  bgcolor="#CCFFCC"
| 2004-04-07 || Win ||align=left| Hayato || K-1 World MAX 2004 World Tournament Open || Tokyo, Japan || Decision (Unanimous) || 3 || 3:00
|-
! style=background:white colspan=9 |
|-
|-  bgcolor="#CCFFCC"
| 2003-11-30 || Win ||align=left| Gurkan Ozkan || No Respect 2 || Melbourne, Australia || KO (Overhand Right) || 12 ||
|-
|-  bgcolor="#FFBBBB"
| 2003-07-05 || Loss ||align=left| Masato || K-1 World MAX 2003 World Tournament Quarter Finals || Saitama, Japan || Decision (Split) || 3 || 3:00
|-
|-  bgcolor="#CCFFCC"
| 2003-05-17 || Win ||align=left| Wanlop SitPholek || Kickboxing Superstar XII || Milan, Italy || Decision || 5 || 3:00
|-
! style=background:white colspan=9 |
|-
|-  bgcolor="#CCFFCC"
| 2003-03-01 || Win ||align=left| Albert Kraus || K-1 World MAX 2003 Japan Grand Prix || Tokyo, Japan || KO (Right Hook) || 2 || 0:16
|-
|-  bgcolor="#CCFFCC"
| 2003-02-18 || Win ||align=left| Niklas Winberg || K-1 No Respect 2003 || Melbourne, Australia || KO || 3 || 1:12
|-
|-  bgcolor="#CCFFCC"
| 2002-11-26 || Win ||align=left| Jenk Behic || K-1 Oceania MAX 2002 Semi Finals || Melbourne, Australia || TKO (Referee Stoppage) || 5 || 2:48
|-
|-  bgcolor="#CCFFCC"
| 2002-12-08 || Win ||align=left| Jenk Behic || W.O.K.A. Super Welterweight World Title Fight || Melbourne, Australia || KO || 6 || 1:46  
|-
! style=background:white colspan=9 |
|-
|-  bgcolor="#CCFFCC"
| 2002-11-26 || Win ||align=left| John Wayne Parr || K-1 Oceania MAX 2002 Final || Melbourne, Australia || Decision || 3 || 3:00
|-
! style=background:white colspan=9 |
|-
|-  bgcolor="#CCFFCC"
| 2002-11-26 || Win ||align=left| Billy Mamu || K-1 Oceania MAX 2002 Quarter Finals || Melbourne, Australia || TKO (Corner Stoppage) || 2 || 
|-
|-  bgcolor="#FFBBBB"
| 2002-11-03 || Loss ||align=left| Youness El Mhassani || Tulp Thaiboks gala || Hoofddorp, Netherlands || Decision (Unanimous) || 5 || 3:00
|-  bgcolor="#FFBBBB"
| 2002-10-05 || Loss ||align=left| Noel Soares || Thaiboxing @ Topsportcentrum  || Rotterdam, Netherlands || Decision (Unanimous) || 5 || 3:00
|-  bgcolor="#CCFFCC"
| 2002-05-19 || Win ||align=left| Hassan Kassrioui || Kickboxing Mania || Athens, Greece || KO (Punches) || 6 || 
|-
|-  bgcolor="#CCFFCC"
| 2002 || Win ||align=left| Petr Polak || "King Of The Ring" Italy Thai Boxing Tournament, Final || Italy || KO (Left Hook) || 1 || 
|-
! style=background:white colspan=9 |
|-
|-  bgcolor="#CCFFCC"
| 2002 || Win ||align=left| Matteo Sciacca || "King Of The Ring" Italy Thai Boxing Tournament, Semi Finals || Italy || KO (Right Hook) || 2 || 
|-
|-  bgcolor="#CCFFCC"
| 2002 || Win ||align=left| Bakari Tounkara || "King Of The Ring" Italy Thai Boxing Tournament, Quarter Finals || Italy || TKO (Referee Stoppage) || 1 || 
|-
|-  bgcolor="#FFBBBB"
| 2002-03-02 || Loss ||align=left| Alain Zankifo || Le Grand Tournoi || Paris, France || TKO (Referee Stoppage, Cut) || 3 || 
|-
|-  bgcolor="#FFBBBB"
| 2001-11-11 || Loss ||align=left| Mike Cope || K-1 Oceania MAX 2001 Quarter Finals || Melbourne, Australia || TKO (Corner Stoppage, Cut) || 1 || 
|-
|-  bgcolor="#CCFFCC"
| 2001-09-08 || Win ||align=left| Shannon Forrester || W.O.K.A. Super Welterweight World Title Fight || Gold Coast, Australia || KO (Punches) || 3 || 
|-
! style=background:white colspan=9 |
|-
|-  bgcolor="#CCFFCC"
| 2001-09-01 || Win ||align=left| Paul Shearing || W.O.K.A. Super Welterweight World Title Fight || Sydney, Australia || KO || 1 || 
|-
! style=background:white colspan=9 |
|-
|-  bgcolor="#CCFFCC"
| 2001-04-03 || Win ||align=left| Krongsak Lek || W.O.K.A. Super Welterweight World Title Fight || Melbourne, Australia || TKO (Referee Stoppage, Punches) || 8 || 1:46
|-
! style=background:white colspan=9 |
|-
|-  bgcolor="#CCFFCC"
| 2000-11-19 || Win ||align=left| Baris Nezif || K-1 Oceania Star Wars 2000 || Melbourne, Australia || KO (Punches) || 12 || 1:46
|-
! style=background:white colspan=9 |
|-
|-
| colspan=9 | Legend:

See also

 List of K-1 Events
 List of K-1 champions
 List of male kickboxers

References

External links
Official site
Official Russian site
Highlight reel

1980 births
Greek male kickboxers
Greek male karateka
Eastern Orthodox Christians from Greece
Welterweight kickboxers
Middleweight kickboxers
Sportspeople from Athens
Living people
SUPERKOMBAT kickboxers